KRSW (89.3 FM) is a radio station licensed to Worthington, Minnesota, serving the Marshall area. The station is owned by Minnesota Public Radio (MPR), and airs MPR's "Classical Music Network," originating from the Twin Cities. MPR maintains office space on the campus of Minnesota West Community and Technical College, but all programming originates from the St. Paul office. The station has local inserts at least once an hour for underwriting and a local weather forecast.

See also Minnesota Public Radio

External links
 KRSW page at Minnesota Public Radio

Radio stations in Minnesota
Minnesota Public Radio
Classical music radio stations in the United States
NPR member stations